The 2015 Strade Bianche was the ninth edition of the Strade Bianche road cycling race. It was a 1.HC-ranked race that was part of the 2015 UCI Europe Tour.

Particularly known for its long sections of dirt roads, the race's name comes from the strade bianche that formed large sections of the route. The race was also hilly throughout, with the finish coming after a particularly difficult climb into Siena.

Traditionally the Strade Bianche was the first of a pair of races alongside the Roma Maxima; the latter event, however, was cancelled in 2015 due to "organisational problems".

The race was won by Zdeněk Štybar, with Greg Van Avermaet finishing second and Alejandro Valverde finishing third.

Route 
The Strade Bianche was part of the spring classics season, which began the week before with the Belgian races Omloop Het Nieuwsblad and Kuurne–Brussels–Kuurne. Many of the same riders then travelled to Tuscany to take part in the Strade Bianche.

The race was unique in the cycling season. The race was often decided, however, on the final climb. This came in the final part of the race: a  climb into Siena, followed by a descent into the finish in the Piazza del Campo.

Pre-race favourites 
The previous year's champion, Michał Kwiatkowski, was not selected for the 2015 race; he participated in Paris–Nice, which started the following day. The runner up from 2014, Peter Sagan was one of the favourites for the event. Another was Fabian Cancellara, who had won the race in 2008 and 2012.

Other riders with a chance at winning the race included Vincenzo Nibali, Rigoberto Urán, Zdeněk Štybar (both ), Simon Gerrans, Alejandro Valverde, Greg Van Avermaet and Ian Stannard.

Teams 

20 teams were selected to take part in the race. 14 of them were UCI WorldTeams and the remaining six were UCI Professional Continental teams.

Report 
An early breakaway was formed by Stefano Pirazzi, Giacomo Berlato and Daniele Colli (both ), Giuseppe Fonzi, Artem Ovechkin, David Lozano, Julián Arredondo and Ilia Koshevoy. This move was ended by attacks from the peloton behind on the Monte Sante Marie, which led to the formation of a new group of riders, including favourites for the race win Fabian Cancellara, Zdeněk Štybar, Alejandro Valverde, Greg Van Avermaet and Peter Sagan. This group earned a large lead, and attacks in the remaining kilometres reduced the race to three main groups. The first of these included Valverde, Van Avermaet and Stybar. Sep Vanmarcke was chasing alone behind them, with another group of Cancellara, Diego Rosa and Daniel Oss behind.

Coming into the final climb, Valverde was the favourite from the leading group, as he was seen as the best climber of the three, and the final climb into Siena was difficult. Valverde, however, had put significant effort into keeping the leading group clear of the chasers, and he was unable to respond to an attack from Van Avermaet at the bottom of the climb. Stybar held Van Avermaet's wheel and was able to pass him as the riders entered the Piazza del Campo to take the race win. Van Avermaet was second and Valverde third, with Vanmarcke holding on alone for fourth place.

Race results

See also 
2015 in men's road cycling

References

External links 

Strade Bianche
Strade Bianche
Strade Bianche